Mary Andrews may refer to:

 Mary Andrews (geologist) (1854–1914), Northern Irish geologist
 Mary Raymond Shipman Andrews (1860–1936), American writer
 Mary Andrews (politician), American politician from Maine
 Mary Kay Andrews (born 1954), author based in Atlanta
 Mary Garard Andrews (born 1852), Universalist minister
 Mary Maria Andrews, Anglican deaconess, missionary and church leader
 Mary Andrews, fictional character in the comic strip Archie's Gang